Kate O'Sullivan is a British actress, singer, voiceover artist and impressionist.

A graduate of Drama Centre London now Central Saint Martins, she was taught by Yat Malmgren and Christopher Fettes.

Theatre
Her first job after leaving Drama Centre was in the West End playing Cecily Cardew in The Importance of Being Earnest at the Whitehall Theatre (now Trafalgar Studios) with Hinge and Bracket. She played Magenta, the extra terrestrial French maid, in the 1991 revival of Richard O’Brien's The Rocky Horror Show  starring Anthony Head and Craig Ferguson at the Piccadilly Theatre and Bristol Hippodrome Theatre. Other musicals include Lust with Denis Lawson at the Theatre Royal, Haymarket, and  Bob Carlton's Keep On Running at Birmingham Rep in which she played the lead Kathleen Karman. In 1994 O'Sullivan appeared with Eric Sykes in a nationwide tour of Ray Cooney's farce Run For Your Wife. In 2008, O'Sullivan returned to the role of Barbara or “Lofty” in Run For Your Wife in a UK tour celebrating the play's 25th Anniversary.

Kate O'Sullivan featured as a writer/performer in Let The People Decide with Barry from Watford (Edinburgh Fringe, 2010). During the 2011 Edinburgh Fringe she performed sketches and stand-up with Sketch Department at The Merchant's Hall, Hannover St. In 2011 she appeared in Q&A: a showcase for new material & improvisation with Steve Furst and Lewis MacLeod at the Leicester Square Theatre.

Television
In 2017, she appeared in Gold sitcom The Rebel starring Simon Callow as a rebellious and magnificently sweary pensioner.

O'Sullivan appeared in episode 1 of Henry IX, a new TV comedy for UK Gold, written by Dick Clement and Ian La Frenais. Also in 2017, she played the role of Mrs Teasdale in series 3 of Roy Clarke's Still Open All Hours. March 2017, she appeared with Dawn French publicizing her new ITV talent series on The One Show, O'Sullivan recalling her childhood appearances as an impressionist on Crackerjack.

O'Sullivan played vet Sally Freeman in two BBC series of Home Farm Twins based on Jenny Oldfield's novels of the same name. She has appeared in Dead Ringers, Channel 4 film Bill's New Frock, directed by Pete Travis, and BBC Scotland sketch show 2000 Not Out with Craig Ferguson.
Other TV work  includes Armando Iannucci's Time Trumpet,  2004: The Stupid Version, BBC 4's Don't Watch That, Watch This, four series of Bremner Bird and Fortune, and the 2008 CGI BBC3 sketch show The Wrong Door in which she voices a Smutty Alien, The World's Most Annoying Creature and myriad other extra terrestrial/android characters. She also played the lead role of 'Girl' in Dead Cat, a short film directed by Derek Jarman and David Lewis.

Impressions
First television appearance as an impressionist was as a child on Seaside Special (1976), hosted by Roger Kitter. This was followed by appearances on BBC children's show Crackerjack.
In 2DTV (series 4 & 5) O'Sullivan supplied all female impressions/characters. Produced by Giles Pilbrow and directed by Tim Searle with Enn Reitel, Lewis MacLeod, and Dave Lamb.
Hedz: comedy sketch show for  CBBC/ BBC Scotland. O'Sullivan supplied all female impressions except the Queen, who was voiced by Peter Dickson. (Bafta:-  Best Children's Light Entertainment 2008). 
She appeared in DoubleTake, created by Alison Jackson (Bafta for Innovation 2001). O'Sullivan's impressions, namely Nancy Dell'Olio and Ulrika Jonsson, featured in Jackson's 2006 production Sven: The Coach, The Cash And His Lovers for Channel 4.
O’Sullivan features as an impressionist in the topical BBC Radio 4 satire starring Rory Bremner Tonight.

Kate O’Sullivan performed stand-up and impressions at the Leicester Square Theatre (2010 and 2011), the New Players Theatre (2010) and Brighton Komedia (2011). In 2011 she performed in Funny Women Sunday Showcase at the Leicester Square Theatre.

Radio
2017 radio includes the roles of Auntie Megs and Zita in new dramatisation of Michael Morpurgo's Alone on a Wide, Wide Sea for BBC Radio 2. For Classic FM: The Pazza Factor: the story of the birth of Classic FM, directed by Bill Dare, producer of Dead Ringers. Written by Sean Grundy and Cara Jennings, it starred Jon Culshaw, Duncan Wisbey as Ralph Bernard and Kate O'Sullivan as Margaret Thatcher. In 2016 she read for Something Understood, produced by Adam Fowler and presented by Mark Tully, also Radio 4. She was a regular on Radio 4's 2014 impression and sketch show starring Lewis Macleod, Duncan Wisbey and Julian Dutton Lewis Macleod Is Not Himself.

A recommendation from Rob Brydon in 1998 secured her first radio job on Five Live's The Treatment. Directed by Steve Punt and Talkwell McCloud, it was hosted by Stuart Maconie from 1994–2001. In October 2008, she was a guest on Steve Punt and Hugh Dennis' sitcom The Party Line for Radio 4, She has played Queen Question in BBC7's Quizland for two series. Other radio includes Hot Gas for Radio 1 and The Sharp End (2010), a sitcom for BBC Radio 2 with Alistair McGowan.

In 2011 Kate O’Sullivan performed in two BBC Radio 4 productions: What To Do If Your Husband May Leave  and Polyoaks the sitcom written by David Spicer and Dr. Phil Hammond, satirizing the government's radical overhaul of the NHS. O'Sullivan plays various roles in Series 2 (2013) of Births, Deaths and Marriages, the BBC Radio 4 sitcom by David Schneider and Simon Jacobs. She is also a panellist on  the 2013 production: Bremner’s One Question Quiz<ref>{{cite web|title=Bremner’s One Question Quiz|url=https://www.bbc.co.uk/programmes/b038jkx6|publisher=BBC Radio 4|accessdate=14 January 2014}}</ref> with Rory Bremner, Andy Zaltzman and Nick Doody, satirising Britishness, the UK's approach to education and the environment.

Blagger's Guide
O'Sullivan has worked with David Quantick and Lewis MacLeod in 6 series of The Blagger's Guide (2005–2013) for Radio 2.  In the first two series, Quantick demonstrates his encyclopaedic knowledge of Rock and Pop and pairs it with fake archive footage and spoof adverts supplied by O'Sullivan, MacLeod and producer Simon Poole. Series Three explores the Classics. Series Four returns to Rock and Pop, and Series Five is The Blagger's Guide To Country. Over the first five series, O'Sullivan plays all female voices, characters and celebrities, among them Dolly Parton, a schoolgirl Kate Bush, all 3 Shangri-Las, Gary Numan's bride-to-be and Beethoven's wife. Series 6, The Blagger's Guide to Jazz and a one-off special: The Blagger's Guide to Bob Dylan, Radio 2 (May/July 2009). In 2012 O’Sullivan & MacLeod provided all voices in Quantick's 4 part Olympic series The Blagger's Guide To The Games. In November 2013, Radio 2 commissioned The Blagger's Guide to Doctor Who as part of its 50th anniversary celebrations which went on to receive a Sony Radio award nomination.

Voiceover
She has supplied the voiceover for thousands of British television and radio commercials since 1996. Recent notable campaigns include Halifax, Marks & Spencer, L’Oreal and Vision Express.
Currently station voice at Absolute Radio with Matt Berry, O’Sullivan is part of the creative team awarded Silver Winner for best Station Imaging at the 2011 Sony Radio Academy Awards (On-Air Marketing Awards category). She is also part of the Absolute Radio creative team which won Gold Best Single Promo/Commercial at the 2012 Sony Radio Academy Awards. She voiced two promos for Nickelodeon (both being SpongeBob's Top 100). They were shown on Nick and Nicktoons. In the promos she was doing an impression of the English Queen. O’Sullivan features in Nickelodeon's SpongeBob SquarePants themed programming stunt called SpongeBob's Top 100. The promo, in which she is doing an impression of the English Queen, won the Bronze Award in the Best Children's Promo (Originated) category of the Promax UK 2012 Awards.
In a promo for a series about ageing, When I’m 65  for BBC  O’Sullivan voices both young and old June Brown eventually morphing both voices into one. The promo won PROMAX Gold in 2012.

CartoonsLego Marvel Super Heroes 2 (2017 Video Game) – Captain Marvel/Enchantress/Morgan le Fay/Ravonna (voice).

O'Sullivan is the voice behind all six Singing Sockroaches for Milkshake!, Channel 5's children's channel. The Sockroaches are a gang of mischievous and singing socks who appear in every episode of the animated TV show The Beeps narrated by Tom Baker. Other cartoons: Treasure; MechaNick; Audrey and Friends.

Most recent animation project is Castle Farm series 1 & 2 (Channel 5, 2010–2012). in which she characterizes Farmer, Cow, She-Ba and Winnie the Hen in the children's animation  She is the voice behind Madam (cow), Mrs Snuffles (pig), Mrs Chickens, Mrs Paw (cat) and Ewerice (sheep) in the CBeebies’ series Big Barn Farm (BBC, 2009).

Audiobooks
O'Sullivan plays the Queen Mother and Susan the Student, among others in the audio adaptation of Robert Rankin’s novel Brightonomicon.  She is also the voice of Professor Peabody in Orion's 2008 audio version of cult comic strip Dan Dare- Voyage To Venus by Frank Hampson, with Rupert Degas, Tom Goodman-Hill and Christian Rodska.

O’Sullivan voices all characters and narrates The Railway Rabbits audio series and Dead Man’s Cove for Orion. She narrates Orion books 1, 2 & 3 of the Charmseekers series by Amy Tree, namely The Queen's Bracelet, The Silver Pool and The Dragon's Revenge, which chronicle  Sesame Brown's quest to find the 13 stolen magical charms belonging to Queen Charm of Karisma. The third of the Charmseekers books, as reviewed by The Independent, is 'read with superb versatility by Kate O'Sullivan'.

Barbara Tate’s West End Girls (Orion, 2011) is also ‘wonderfully narrated by Kate O’Sullivan’.

Writing
While co-presenting the children's series, O'Sullivan wrote material for Wham! Bam! Strawberry Jam!(BBC 1995) and was commissioned by Thames TV Head of Comedy John Howard Davies to co-write a sitcom pilot "Different Drummers".

O'Sullivan is part of the writing team for Tonight (BBC Radio 4, 2011–2012) with Rory Bremner, Andy Zaltzman, Nick Doody, John Langdon and Geoff Atkinson.

O'Sullivan wrote and performed with the 2010 Edinburgh Fringe show Let The People Decide'', starring Barry from Watford. In 2011, she co-founded the customer-facing humour delivery company with Mel Hudson and Alex Baldacci, known as 'Sketch Department' writing sketches and stand-up for a week-long run at the Edinburgh Fringe.

Trivia
As a child, O'Sullivan was awarded the title Crackerjack Young Entertainer of the Year 1978 for her impressions of Frank Spencer, the Muppet Show, Margaret Thatcher and Lena Zavaroni on the popular children's TV show Crackerjack, hosted by Ed "Stewpot" Stewart.  On winning the competition, for which 900 other hopefuls had auditioned, she was given an Aiwa sound system, a signed photograph of Bernie Clifton and a coveted Crackerjack pen.

References

External links

Kate O'Sullivan on Comedy Caster
Kate O'Sullivan at Hobsons International

Living people
Year of birth missing (living people)
British stage actresses
British television actresses
Place of birth missing (living people)
Alumni of the Drama Centre London